Events from 2022 in New Caledonia.

Incumbents 

 High Commissioner: Patrice Faure
 President of the Government: Louis Mapou
 Vice President of the Government: Isabelle Champmoreau
 President of Congress: Roch Wamytan

Events 
Ongoing – COVID-19 pandemic in New Caledonia

 23 January – Radio New Zealand reported that New Caledonia was reporting an average of 300 new daily cases after the SARS-CoV-2 Omicron variant reached the territory earlier in January.
 7 February  – Cyclone Dovi causes one death in New Caledonia.

Deaths 

 2 October – André Sinédo, 44,footballer (AS Magenta, national team).

References 

2022 in New Caledonia
2020s in New Caledonia
Years of the 21st century in New Caledonia
New Caledonia